Bury Corporation Tramways operated a tramway service in Bury, Greater Manchester, England between 1903 and 1949.

History

Services started on 3 June 1903, on the first line to Fairfield. The tram depot site was located between George Street and Foundry Street. The power station operated by Bury Corporation Electricity Department, was on the opposite side of Rochdale Road, near to Derby Street.

Routes were opened as follows:
3 June 1903 Jericho to Moorside
21 May 1904 Moorside to Bury
21 April 1904 Heap Bridge to Bury via Heywood St, Spring St and Frederick St 
29 April 1904 Bury to Rochdale Road (Heywood St) via Princess St
20 May 1904 Bury to Limefield
20 July 1904 Bury to Unsworth boundary and Whitefield Station
10 August 1904 Bury to Barracks (Bolton Rd)
16 September 1904 Bury to Tottington
4 January 1905 Radcliffe Bridge to Whitefield 
18 April 1905 Radcliffe Bridge to Stopes
5 May 1905 Radcliffe Bridge to Black Lane
24 June 1905 Bury to Radcliffe Town Hall
20 May 1907 Bury to Barracks extended to Breightmet
17 November 1905 Bury to Rochdale Road extended from Heap Bridge to Heywood Market Place and Hopwood
24 February 1915 Moorside to Bury extended to Smethurst Hall, and Bury to Limefield extended to Walmersley

By this time the company transported 16 million passengers a year, 

In 1925 an agreement was reached with Rochdale Corporation Tramways for through running to Rochdale and 1926 a joint service with Salford Corporation Tramways between Bury and Victoria was opened.

Closure

Abandonment of the tram services started as early as 3 July 1932, when the service between Rochdale to Bury via Heywood was withdrawn. However, the total closure of the service was delayed for several more years until on 13 February 1949, tram 13 operated the last service.

References

Tram transport in Greater Manchester
Bury, Greater Manchester
Historic transport in Lancashire